Hive was built in 1820 at Deptford, England. She made two voyages transporting convicts to New South Wales. She was wrecked on 10 December 1835 during the second of these voyages.

First convict voyage (1834): Under the command of John Luscombe, she left Portsmouth on 29 January 1834, carrying 250 male convicts. Hive arrived in Sydney on 11 June 1834 and had two deaths en route.

Second convict voyage (1835): Hive left Ireland, under the command of John Nutting in late August 1835, carrying 250 male convicts. While travelling up the east coast of New South Wales, she ran aground south of Jervis Bay at a site now known as Wreck Bight on 10 December 1835 and was wrecked. Two convicts had died en route; a crew member died in the mishap.

See also

Hive shipwreck

References

Further reading 
 2nd Report on the Maritime Archaeological Investigation of the Convict Transport HIVE (1820-1836)
 NSW Heritage webpage on the Hive

1820 ships
Ships built in Deptford
Convict ships to New South Wales
Maritime incidents in December 1835
1788–1850 ships of Australia
Cutters of Australia
Shipwrecks of the Shoalhaven Region
Merchant ships of Australia